Tony Labranche (born November 11, 2001) is a New Hampshire politician. He was the youngest member of the New Hampshire House of Representatives and the youngest openly LGBTQ+ legislator in United States history.

Early life 
Tony Labranche was born in Nashua, New Hampshire on November 11, 2001, to parents Patrick Labranche and Sandra Martin. Both of whom are originally from Thetford Mines, Québec where the majority of his family still lives today. Labranche was diagnosed with stage three colon cancer at age ten. In 2014, Labranche moved to Amherst, New Hampshire.

Education 
Labranche graduated from Souhegan High School in early 2020. Labranche currently attends Nashua Community College and is majoring in political science.

Political career 
In April 2020 Labranche was selected to serve as an alternate delegate for Bernie Sanders at the 2020 Democratic National Convention.

While finishing his senior year of high school Labranche ran unsuccessfully for the Souhegan Cooperative School Board. Labranche then pursued a seat in the New Hampshire House of Representatives. Labranche won that bid, and took office on December 3, 2020.

In 2021 Labranche ran for Rules Committee of the New Hampshire Democratic Party.  In the same year Labranche ran again for a seat on the Souhegan Cooperative School Board unsuccessfully.

In 2022 Labranche announced that he would leave the Democratic Party and caucus as an Independent. He cited issues with New Hampshire Democratic Party Leadership, Joe Biden's COVID-19 response, and the two-party system as reasons for his departure.

On August 8, 2022, Labranche resigned from the New Hampshire House of Representatives.

References

2001 births
Living people
Democratic Party members of the New Hampshire House of Representatives
People from Amherst, New Hampshire
21st-century American politicians
People from Nashua, New Hampshire
LGBT state legislators in New Hampshire
Politicians from Nashua, New Hampshire
21st-century LGBT people